Nikolay Nikolayevich Bordyuzha (born 1949 in Oryol) is a Russian general and politician.

Biography
In 1972, he graduated from Perm Military School of the High Command of the Russian Strategic Rocket Forces and later attended KGB intelligence courses in Novosibirsk.

From 1989 to 1991, he was Head of KGB human resources, and from 1992 to 1998 served as First Deputy Chief and later Chief of Russia's Federal Borderguard Service.

On 7 December 1998, he was appointed Secretary of the Security Council of the Russian Federation, and also Chief of the Russian presidential administration. He served in this position until 18 March 1999. During this period he was viewed by some analysts as a possible successor to President Boris Yeltsin.

From 1999 to 2003, Bordyuzha served as the Russian ambassador to Denmark.

On 28 April 2003, he was appointed Secretary General of the Collective Security Treaty Organization, a military pact of the Commonwealth of Independent States.

He holds the rank of Colonel General.

Honours and awards

Russian Federation
 Order For Merit to the Fatherland, 4th class
 Order of Courage
 Order of Friendship
 Medal For Distinction in Protection of the State Borders
 Medal "In Commemoration of the 850th Anniversary of Moscow"

Soviet Union
 Medals "For Distinction in Military Service" 1st and 2nd classes
 Jubilee Medal "50 Years of the Armed Forces of the USSR"
 Jubilee Medal "60 Years of the Armed Forces of the USSR"
 Jubilee Medal "70 Years of the Armed Forces of the USSR"
 Medals "For Impeccable Service" 1st, 2nd and 3rd classes

Foreign
 Order of Friendship (Kazakhstan)
 Order of Friendship of Peoples (Belarus)

See also
Commanders of the border troops USSR and RF
Shanghai Cooperation Organisation

References

External links
Bordyuzha's biography 

1949 births
Living people
People from Oryol
Commonwealth of Independent States
Ambassador Extraordinary and Plenipotentiary (Russian Federation)
Ambassadors of Russia to Denmark
Soviet Army officers
Russian colonel generals
Kremlin Chiefs of Staff
KGB officers
Recipients of the Order of Courage
Recipients of the Order "For Merit to the Fatherland", 4th class
Recipients of the Order "For Merit to the Fatherland", 3rd class